The House at 17 Aurora Street in the village of Moravia, Cayuga County, New York, is listed on the National Register of Historic Places.

Description and history 
It is a two-story, frame Greek Revival style dwelling, constructed in about 1850. The structure features a full front pediment, corner pilasters, shouldered architraves, and transom and sidelights around the front door.

It was listed on the National Register of Historic Places on February 24, 1995.

References

External links

Houses on the National Register of Historic Places in New York (state)
Greek Revival houses in New York (state)
Houses in Cayuga County, New York
National Register of Historic Places in Cayuga County, New York
Moravia (village), New York